I Learned from the Gaels is an EP by Scottish indie folk artist King Creosote, released on 28 May 2012 on Domino Records. Produced by Paul Savage, the EP features full-band re-recordings of three tracks from Creosote's vinyl-only album, That Might Be It, Darling (2010), alongside a new track, "Little Man", featuring frequent collaborator Alan "Gummi Bako" Stewart on lead vocals.

The EP was subsequently compiled alongside follow-up EPs, To Deal With Things and It Turned Out for the Best, to create the full length-album, That Might Well Be It, Darling (2013).

Reception

Drowned in Sound's Dan Cooper-Gavin gave the EP a positive review, stating: "While Diamond Mine often felt like a rather solitary record, I Learned From The Gaels is anything but, with its ramshackle glee a world away from Jon Hopkins’ atmospherics. But while it’s not an EP that demands to be cherished, it’s certainly one to savour regardless."

Track listing
"Doubles Underneath"
"Near Star, Pole Star"
"Single Cheep"
"Little Man"

References

2012 EPs
King Creosote albums